Adeola Ariyo is a Nigerian born model who became Elizabeth Arden's first ever African Ambassador in 2014. She began her modelling career at the age of 13 after being scouted for and participating in the London Fashion Week. Adeola is sometimes referred to as a Nigerian-Ghanaian because of her mixed heritage. She is born to a Ghanaian Mother and Nigerian Father.

Early life
Adeola was born in Lagos to a Ghanaian Mother and a Nigerian Father. She grew up in Nigeria but sometimes travel to London with her father. Her participation in the London Fashion Week at the age of 13 was made possible when she went shopping with her father in London. While she spend most of her time in Cape Town, South Africa, Adeola also travel to Lagos and London.

Modelling
Adeola Modelling career began at the early age of 13 when she met Alek Wek and Kate Moss just after being signed by the London Fashion Week agency. In 2005, she participated in the Nokia Face of Africa Competition and since then, she has been very active in the international modelling scene. Aside featuring in the London Fashion Week, Adeola has also featured in other fashion weeks. Notable among them are the Johannesburg Fashion Week, Mozambique Fashion Week, Cape Town Fashion Week, Arise Fashion Week Lagos and the London Fashion Week. She spent several years modelling in South Africa before securing the Elizabeth Arden appointment in February 2014. Aside featuring in different fashion weeks, Adeola also featured for a number of fashion publications such as Marie Claire, True Love and Fair Lady, Cosmopolitan and Glamour.

Other works
Being an African personality, Adeola has also been involved in a number of charity works and awareness creation projects. Notable among her charity projects is her involvement with "The Lunchbox Fund", a project aimed at providing daily meal for vulnerable school children and orphan in South Africa. Adeola was also involved in other Elizabeth Arden project like the "Make a Visible Difference” Campaign.

References 

21st-century Nigerian businesspeople
Beauty pageant contestants from Lagos
Businesspeople from Lagos
Living people
University of South Africa alumni
Nigerian fashion businesspeople
Nigerian female models
Models from Lagos
Year of birth missing (living people)
Yoruba beauty pageant contestants
Yoruba female models
Nigerian people of Ghanaian descent
Nigerian child models
People from Lagos State
Yoruba people